Joseph-Bruno Guigues, (26 August 1805 – 8 February 1874), was an Oblate priest, a teacher and became the first bishop of the diocese of Bytown (Ottawa) serving from (1847–1874). His consecration service in 1848 was performed by Rémi Gaulin,  bishop of Kingston.
 
It was said that he was a simple man and that as bishop, he discharged the duties of parish priest by hearing confession in his cathedral and visiting the sick. He stayed in touch with his diocese, toured it regularly, and made himself available to the people of the parishes.

References 
 

1805 births
1874 deaths
People from Gap, Hautes-Alpes
19th-century Roman Catholic bishops in Canada
French emigrants to Canada
Roman Catholic archbishops of Ottawa–Cornwall
Missionary Oblates of Mary Immaculate